Newlands is a parish in the Tweeddale committee area of the Scottish Borders council area, in southeastern  Scotland.

Geography
Newlands is on the B7059, off the A701 road, near Bordlands.

Newlands was formerly within the historic county of Peeblesshire.

The Flemington Path is a signed public footpath between Newlands and Peebles.

See also
List of places in the Scottish Borders

References

External links

RCAHMS record for Newlands Church
Peeblesshire News, 30 April 2010: Newlands loan funding agreed
Newlands School HMIE inspection

Villages in the Scottish Borders
Peeblesshire
Parishes in Peeblesshire
Tweeddale